Oakland Roots Sports Club is an American professional soccer team based in Oakland, California. The club was
formed in 2018 by a group of Oakland natives, and began play in the National Independent Soccer Association in the fall of 2019. In 2021, the club joined the second division USL Championship.

History
The club was formed in July 2018, and would be known as Oakland Roots Sports Club. The club originally was slated to play in the NPSL Founders Cup, but the club ultimately withdrew and instead joined the National Independent Soccer Association, a Division III sanctioned United States Soccer Federation professional league.

Oakland Roots began by signing three Oakland-raised players in the spring of 2019: Devante Dubose, Julio Cervantes and Yohannes Harish. This was followed by the signing of several higher profile players as the club built out its inaugural rosters. Those players included former San Jose native and MLS player Benji Joya, former Honduran World Cup veteran and San Jose Earthquake Victor Bernardez, and former first-round MLS draft pick Jack McInerney.

The club announced Bay Area native and former MLS player and Colorado Rapids technical director Paul Bravo as its first head coach on May 9, 2019.

National Independent Soccer Association
The club opened the inaugural 2019–20 NISA season as the league's first game, at home in front of a sold-out crowd of more than 4,500. McInerney would score a first half perfect hat trick in a match that would eventually end up in a 3–3 draw.

Oakland Roots played eight games in their inaugural season: six in NISA and two friendlies against Mexican clubs FC Juarez and Atlético Zacatepec. The club picked up their first win at home against Atlético Zacatepec by a score of 2–0.

Oakland Roots sold out all four of their home games in the 2019 fall season averaging 4,927 fans, including a record 5,723 in their final home game, a 1–1 draw vs Los Angeles Force.

On October 31, 2019, Oakland Roots and Bravo mutually agreed to part ways. On December 3, 2019, Oakland Roots announced Jordan Ferrell as the club's new head coach.

The Roots opened their second season at home once again in front of a sold-out crowd of 5,603. The match against Chattanooga FC would end in a 1–1 draw when McInerney scored in the 93rd minute of the match after the Roots were forced to play a man down from a first-half red card. The Roots followed this up by winning their first-ever NISA league match the following weekend vs Michigan Stars FC 2–1.

On April 27, 2020, following an extended stoppage of play due to the COVID-19 pandemic, NISA announced the cancellation of the 2020 spring season.

In the abridged 2020 fall regular season, Oakland finished first in the three team Western Conference, with Matthew Fondy leading the team with two goals. The Roots finished atop its group in the NISA Fall Championship, and beat Chattanooga FC in the national semifinal, before falling to Detroit City FC, 2–1, in the final.

USL Championship
On September 15, 2020, the team announced they would be moving from the third-division NISA to the second-division USL Championship.

Initially in 2017, the USL approved a bid from real estate developer Mark Hall to bring a soccer team to Concord, California instead of Oakland. The team, called USL East Bay, planned to play in a 15,000+ seat soccer-specific stadium complex before the development idea was scrapped in May 2020. The team's territorial rights were later sold to the Roots.

In November 2020, Oakland Roots announced the signing of Oakland born, Richmond, California raised midfielder Saalih Muhammad via a transfer from New Mexico United as the club's first USL Championship player. This was followed by the early December signings of Oakland raised Max Ornstil and re-signings of Yohannes Harish and Tarn Weir, as well as many others.

In April 2021, Marshawn Lynch joined the Roots ownership group.

Oakland Roots picked up their first USL Championship win on May 23 at LA Galaxy II when striker Jeremy Bokila scored in stoppage time to give Oakland the 3–2 win. The team was set to kick off the USL Championship home season on June 19 against Sacramento Republic FC, but the match was called off due to field issues. This was then followed by multiple games being called off due to USL health and safety protocols during the COVID-19 Pandemic.

The team went on to play multiple games at Las Positas College before finishing the season back home at Laney. The club had just one win through their first 13 games. The club placed dead last in the USL Power Rankings  in August.

The team began a massive turnaround with a 2–1 win at Merritt College, powered by goals from Ornstil and Harish. From there, Oakland went on to pick up 34 points in 19 games, earning the final Pacific Division playoff spot on the final day of the season following a 1–0 win over Sporting Kansas City II.

Oakland upset the Mountain Division Champions El Paso Locomotive in the first round of the playoffs, breaking a 470-day home unbeaten run by the Texas side. The Roots’ playoff run came to an end the following weekend when the team lost 6–5 on penalties against Orange County SC after 120 minutes of scoreless action.

On December 21, 2021, the Roots announced they were leasing the former Oakland Raiders practice facility in Alameda, California as their training facility.

On December 30, 2021, the Roots announced Juan Guerra as the club's fourth head coach.

On October 23, 2022, the Roots upset San Diego Loyal 3–0 in the first round of the playoffs. This punched their ticket to play San Antonio, where they lost 3–0.

Record

Year-by-year

Stadium
Roots home matches are played at Laney College Football Stadium, a multi-purpose stadium located near Lake Merritt. For Roots games the pitch is widened using a modular turf system. The Stadium has room for 3,500 seated and up to 5,500+ with standing room.

Average attendance 

 For games at Laney and Merritt only

Club culture

Local sporting and music culture has featured the club's crest, designed by Matthew Wolff. Roots merchandise has been featured in two G-Eazy videos “West Coast” and "Bang". A Roots shirt also appeared in Zion I "Flame Go" Video a few months later. Oakland native Damian Lillard wore Oakland Roots merchandise before a game in the 2019 NBA playoffs. Oakland rapper Mistah F.A.B performed before the club's final home game of 2019. Kevon Looney of the Golden State Warriors wore a Roots t-shirt on the bench during a regular season NBA game. Roots merchandise featured in Kehlani's video "All me" on February 13, 2020. Underground rappers Murs and The Grouch performed prior to the team's March 7, 2020 match against Michigan Stars FC.

The club partners with local non-profit organizations as part of a community outreach effort. The club joined the Common Goal movement on June 30, 2020, as the first soccer club in the United States to do so. The team pledged to donate one percent of the team's payroll and one percent of all future ticket revenue to help address social inequality.

Roots Justice Fund
The club created the Oakland Roots Justice Fund is a charitable fund to support racial and gender justice. The club stated the fund would support new and existing initiatives by the Roots and community partners to "support causes at the intersection of racial and gender justice." The fund was established with donations by the Roots investor group.

Supporters
Oakland Roots has five main supporters groups; Roots Radicals, La Brigada Del Pueblo, Oakland 68s, Homegrown Hooligans, and Los Roots. "The Function" is a coalition of fans from all five groups. "The Function" is in reference to E-40's single, while “Roots Radicals” is an ode to the East Bay Punk Rock band Rancid.

Associated teams

Project 51O

The Oakland Roots reserve team, Project 51O, was launched on December 9, 2019. Originally set to compete in the National Premier Soccer League for the 2020 season, the team only played one match, a win over Napa Valley 1839 FC, before the season was halted and eventually cancelled due to COVID-19.

On September 17, 2020, the team announced it would compete in USL League Two beginning with the 2021 season. They eventually would forgo the season and start play in 2022.

Oakland Soul SC
On May 24, 2022, Oakland Roots SC launched their women's team, Oakland Soul. The Soul will kick off in the USL W League for the 2023 season.

Sponsorship

Players and staff

Current roster

Technical staff

 Noah Delgado, Head Coach
 Gavin Glinton, Assistant coach
 Dannylo Allyon, Assistant coach
 Peter Davis, Goalkeeper coach
 Jordan Ferrell, Technical Director
 Nana Attakora, Director of Player Personnel
 Eric Yamamoto, VP of Soccer

Managerial records

Honors

League
National Independent Soccer Association
Western Conference
 Champion (1): 2020

Team Awards
Player of the Year
 2019: Jack McInerney
 2020: Matthew Fondy
 2021: Emrah Klimenta
 2022: Óttar Magnús Karlsson
Goal of the Year
 2019: Ryan Masch
 2020: Angel Heredia
 2021: Johnny Rodriguez
 2022: Johnny Rodriguez
Roots Righteous Award
 2019: Kevin Gonzalez
 2020: Julio Cervantes
 2021: Tarn Weir, Jesús Enríquez
 2022: Matias FissoreOakland Branch Award 2021: Memo Diaz
 2022: Jesús EnríquezProject 51O Player of the Year 2022:''' Javier Ruiz Duran

References

External links

 
2018 establishments in California
Association football clubs established in 2018
Soccer clubs in Oakland, California
Sports teams in Oakland, California
National Independent Soccer Association teams